Rec. (stylized as [REC.]; read as "recording") is the debut solo extended play (EP) by South Korean singer Yuju. It was released by Konnect Entertainment on January 18, 2022. The album consists of five songs, including the title track "Play". This is her first solo release since she joined Konnect Entertainment after GFriend's disbandment.

Background and release 
On September 1, 2021, following GFriend's disbandment and her departure from Source Music, Yuju signed an exclusive contract with Konnect Entertainment as a soloist.

On January 3, 2022, it was reported that Yuju will debut on January 18 with the extended play titled [REC.]. The following day, the schedule of the EP was released. Preorders began on January 5. On the same day, it was confirmed that the title track of the album is called "Play" and was written  and composed by herself. On January 6, a concept film for the EP was published on Konnect Entertainment official YouTube channel. The day after, the track listing of the album was released, confirming that it has five songs, all written by Yuju herself. The next two days, two concept photos of Yuju were released: "Take 1" on January 8 and "Take 2" on January 9. On January 10, a lyric poster spoiled a lyric of the title track "Play" :

The first teaser for "Play" was released on January 12. The album sampler of the EP was released then two days later, followed by a live version of the sampler as a special gift on January 16. The following day, Konnect Entertainment revealed the second and final teaser for "Play".

The EP was released on January 18 along with the music video for "Play".

Track listing

Charts

Weekly charts

Monthly charts

Release history

References 

2022 debut EPs
Korean-language EPs
Konnect Entertainment EPs